Smeshkovo is a rural locality (a village) in Nikolskoye Rural Settlement, Kaduysky District, Vologda Oblast, Russia. The population was 22 as of 2002.

Geography 
Smeshkovo is located 28 km northeast of Kaduy (the district's administrative centre) by road. Stan is the nearest rural locality.

References 

Rural localities in Kaduysky District